The 2003–04 season was the 108th season of competitive association football and first season in the Football Conference played by Shrewsbury Town Football Club, a professional football club based in Shrewsbury, Shropshire, England. Their twenty-fourth-place finish in 2002–03 Football League Third Division meant they were relegated from The Football League – fifty-three years after they joined it – and were playing their first season in Football Conference. The season began on 1 July 2003 and concluded on 30 June 2004.

Jimmy Quinn, who was starting his first full season as player-manager, signed eight players before the summer transfer window closed. Shrewsbury occupied a play-off position for most of the season, and finished the Football Conference season in third place, failing to reach the automatic promotion place but securing a berth in the play-offs. Shrewsbury beat Barnet 5–3 in a penalty shoot-out in the semi-final having drawn 2–2 on aggregate. They won the 2004 Football Conference play-off Final, which took place at the Britannia Stadium, by beating Aldershot Town 3–0 on penalties after the match ended in a 1–1 draw; which meant the club was promoted back into The Football League in the newly renamed Football League Two. They lost in their opening round matches in both the 2003–04 FA Cup and Football League Cup, and were eliminated in the quarter-finals of the FA Trophy.

Thirty players made at least one appearance in nationally organised first-team competition, and there were fifteen different goalscorers. Goalkeeper Scott Howie and defenders David Ridler and Darren Tinson missed only five of the fifty-one competitive matches played over the season. Luke Rodgers finished as leading scorer with fifteen goals, of which thirteen came in league competition and two came in the play-offs.

Background and pre-season

In April 2003 Kevin Ratcliffe resigned as manager of Shrewsbury Town, four years after taking the position, he took responsibility for the club's poor run of where only two league games were won after the turn of the year and their relegation from The Football League was confirmed. Player Mark Atkins was placed in charge for the final game of the season against his original club Scunthorpe United at home which ended in a 2–1 defeat. Released following the end of the 2002–03 season were Nigel Jemson, Peter Wilding, Andy Thompson, Jason van Blerk, Scott Partridge, Nick Evans and Chris Courtney. Andy Tretton, Josh Walker, Greg Rioch, Steve Guinan and Chris Murphy also left the club after departing for Hereford United, Moor Green, Northwich Victoria, Hereford United and Telford United respectively.

Jimmy Quinn was announced as Shrewsbury's manager before the start of the 2003–04 season. New signings ahead of the start of the season comprised five defenders and one of each of the other positions: goalkeeper Scott Howie from Bristol Rovers, midfielder Martin O'Connor from Walsall and forward Colin Cramb from Fortuna Sittard. The five defenders were Ian Fitzpatrick from Halifax Town, David Ridler from Scarborough, Darren Tinson from Macclesfield Town and both Jake Sedgemore and Greg Rioch from Northwich Victoria.

Summary and aftermath

Shrewsbury spent the whole of the season in the top half of the table, rising as high as second place in September 2003 while never dropping below sixth after the first round of fixtures. Shrewsbury's defensive record was the second best in the Football Conference with forty-two goals conceded, bettered only by the league winners, Chester City (thirty-four). Howler, Ridler and Tinson recorded the highest number of appearances during the season, each appearing in forty-six of Shrewsbury's fifty-one games. Rodgers was Shrewsbury's top scorer in the league and in all competitions, with thirteen league goals and fifteen in total. Three other players, Cramb, Darby and Lowe, reached double figures.

Prior to the club's Football League return, Shrewsbury released Fitzpatrick, Packer, Parker and Thompson. Quinn was also released as a player but remained as the club's manager into the  season. New players to join were defender Dave Walton from Derby County and forward John Grant from Telford United. Dunbavin transferred back to Northwich Victoria for free.

Match details
League positions are sourced by Statto, attendance numbers are sourced to Soccerbase; while the remaining information is referenced individually. Shrewsbury's score is listed first in the score columns.

Football Conference

FA Cup

Football League Trophy

FA Trophy

Football Conference play-offs

a.  Aggregate score was 2–2; Shrewsbury Town won 5–3 in a penalty shoot-out
b.  Score remained 1–1 after extra time; Shrewsbury Town won 3–0 in a penalty shoot-out

See also
 List of Shrewsbury Town F.C. seasons

References

External links
 2003–04 Shrewsbury Town F.C. season at Soccerbase
 2003–04 Shrewsbury Town F.C. season  at Statto.com

Shrewsbury Town F.C. seasons
Shrewsbury Town